Devin E. Naar is the Isaac Alhadeff Professor in Sephardic Studies at the University of Washington. He is descended from Sephardic Jews who emigrated to the United States in the 1920s.

Works

References

Living people
Year of birth missing (living people)
American Sephardic Jews
University of Washington faculty
American people of Greek-Jewish descent
Jewish historians